Thapi Dharma Rao Naidu (1887–1973) was a Telugu writer, lyricist and social reformer. He wrote dialogues and lyrics for the films like Mala Pilla, Drohi, Thathaji, Bhishma, and Patni. He was awarded the Sahitya Akademi Award for Indian Literature. He had authored many books which were the eye openers for many in the field of social sciences in India, in particular South India. His books Vidhi Vilasam, many more have found a place in the annals of Indian literature.

Honours
Andhra Sahitya Akademi honored him with 'Visishta Sabhyathvam'.
The chief priest of Sringeri Sharada Peetham honored him by conferring the title Andhra Visharada for his extraordinary service to Telugu language.
He was senate member of Sri Venkateswara University.

Family
Thapi Dharma Rao Naidu had two daughters and three sons.

Literary works
 Devalayala Meeda Bhutu Bommalenduku?
 Pelli- Dani Puttupurvotharalu,
 Inupakatchadalu,
 Pathapali, Kotha Pali,
 All India Adukkutinevalla Mahasabha,
 Sahityamormaralu.
 Rallu-Rappalu is his autobiography from 1887 to 1908.
 Translated Leo Tolstoy's Anna Karenina in Telugu (1952)

Filmography
Mohini Rugmangada (1937)
Malapilla (1938) (dialogue)
Raitu Bidda (1939) (dialogue)
Illalu (1940)
Krishna Prema (1943) (adaptation) (dialogue)
Drohi (1948)
Keelugurram (1949)
Palletoori Pilla (1950) (dialogue)
Paramanandayya Shishyula Katha (1950) (adaptation) (dialogue)
Mangala (1951) (dialogue)
Kanna Talli (1953)
Rojulu Marayi (1955) (dialogue)

References
20th Century Luminaries, Potti Sreeramulu Telugu University, Hyderabad, 2005.

External links
The Encyclopaedia Of Indian Literature (Volume Two); page: 995.
 Thapi Dharma Rao profile in IMDb.

Journalists from Bihar
Indian male journalists
Telugu-language lyricists
1887 births
1973 deaths
Recipients of the Sahitya Akademi Award in Telugu
Indian social reformers
People from Ganjam district
20th-century Indian writers
20th-century Indian male writers